Home Boy (Sister Out) is an album by jazz trumpeter Don Cherry released on the Barclay label in 1985. The album was re-issued, by We Want Sounds, in June 2018.

Background 
In 2018, We Want Sounds described the album:
Recorded at Studio Caroline, a hotbed for the African diaspora in Paris during the 80s, and produced by French-Chilean musician and producer Ramuntcho Matta (his father is Chilean painter Roberto Matta and half-brother is cult New York artist Gordon Matta-Clark), Home Boy, Sister Out is one of Don Cherry's most original albums.

Matta is one of the true architects of that 1980s Paris sound mixing music from all over the Planet with the street vibe of the French capital. He had spent his formative years in Paris and then switched to New York, where he lived between 1978 and 1980, interacting with the cream of the Downtown scene, including Laurie Anderson, Meredith Monk, Peter Gordon, Arto Lindsay, The Talking Heads and many more.

Reception

In a review for Pitchfork, Daniel Martin-McCormick wrote: "For all its flaws, Home Boy is a grower. Cherry’s magnetism remains, despite the chintzy production and slapdash approach."

Writing for Bandcamp Daily, Dean Van Nguyen called the album "a lost record from an oft undervalued time in the musician's life that nonetheless offers a vital document for anyone trying to fully map Cherry's pluralistic, technicolor world."

Track listing
All compositions by Don Cherry except as indicated

 Butterfly Friend (3:45) (lyrics by Moki Cherry)
 I Walk (3:12) (music and lyrics by Ramuntcho Matta)
 Rappin Recipe (6:48)
 Reggae To The High Tower (4:11)
 Art Deco (2:53)
 Call Me (4:36) (lyrics by Elli Medeiros)
 Treat Your Lady Right (6:09)
  Alphabet City (3:43)
 Bamako Love (5:41)

Personnel
 Don Cherry – pocket trumpet, vocals, piano, synthesizer, melodica
 Ramuntcho Matta – guitar
 Jannick Top – bass
 Negrito Trasante – bongos, congas, talking drum, rhythm box
 Polo Lombardo – konks
 Claude Salmieri – drums
 Fil Mong – bass
 Jean-Pierre Coco – congas
 Abdoulaye Prosper Niang – drums
 Elli Medeiros – backing vocals

References

Barclay (record label) albums
Don Cherry (trumpeter) albums
1985 albums